Several elections took place in the U.S state of Georgia in 2020. The general election was held on November 3, 2020, and the runoff on January 5, 2021. A combined partisan primary for president and all other offices on the ballot was held on June 9, 2020, with a primary runoff held on August 11.  

To vote by mail, registered Georgia voters must have requested a ballot by October 30, 2020. By early October some 1,589,147 voters requested mail ballots. Following the November 3, 2020 general election, voters whose mail-in ballots were rejected could make corrections ("cure") until 5 p.m. on Friday, November 6, 2020.

Federal offices

President of the United States

Georgia had 16 electoral votes in the Electoral College. Democrat Joe Biden won all of them with 49.5% of the popular vote. It was the first time a Democratic presidential candidate had won Georgia since Bill Clinton in 1992.

United States House of Representatives

General

Georgia had 14 seats in the United States House of Representatives which were up for election. The Republicans won 8 while the Democrats won 6. Democrats gained one seat, the 7th district.

Special

A special election was held for the 5th district due to the death of the incumbent John Lewis. The first round was held on September 29 and the runoff was held on December 1. Democrat Kwanza Hall won the seat.

United States Senate

General 

Incumbent Republican David Perdue, first elected in 2014, lost his reelection bid to challenger Jon Ossoff. Perdue won the first round with 49.73% of the vote, but in the runoff election lost to Ossoff's 50.57% vote share.

Special 

Following the resignation of Senator Johny Isakson in 2019, Governor Brian Kemp appointed Kelly Loeffler to serve out the term. Republican Senator Loeffler then went on to come second in the first round with 25.9% of the vote while Democratic pastor Raphael Warnock won with 32.9%. Warnock went on to win in the runoff with 51.04% of the vote, becoming the first black senator to represent Georgia.

Public Service Commission 

Elections were held for Public Service Commission districts 1 and 4.

District 1 Democratic primary
 Robert G. Bryant

Primary results

District 1 Republican primary
 Jason Shaw, incumbent

Primary results

District 1 General Election

District 4 Democratic primary
 Daniel Blackman
 John Noel

Primary results

District 4 Republican primary
 Lauren “Bubba” McDonald, Jr., incumbent

Primary results

District 4 General Election

Runoff results

General Assembly

State Senate

All 56 seats in the Georgia State Senate were up for election in 2020. The Republicans won 34 seats and the Democrats won 22 seats.

State House

All 180 seats in the Georgia House of Representatives were up for election in 2020. The Republicans won 103 seats and the Democrats won 77 seats.

District Attorneys
Out of the state's 49 judicial circuits, 40 held elections for district attorney, and 15 incumbents were replaced either by primary or general election. In addition, a special election for the Western Judicial Circuit saw the appointed incumbent Democrat defeated in the first round, with Deborah Gonzalez winning the second round against James Chafin (independent).
 
 Augusta: Natalie Paine (R) was defeated by Jared Williams (D)
 Brunswick: Jackie Johnson (R) was defeated by Keith Higgins (independent)
 Chatham: Meg Heap (R) was defeated by Shelena Cook Jones (D)
 Chattahoochee: Julia Slater (D) was defeated in the Democratic primary by Mark Jones (D), who had no general challenger
 Cobb: Joyette Holmes (R) was defeated by Flynn Broady (D)
 Fulton: Paul Howard (D) was defeated in the Democratic primary runoff by Fani Willis (D), who had no general challenger
 Gwinnett: Danny Porter (R) was defeated by Patsy Austin-Gatson (D)
 Macon: David Cooke (D) was defeated in the Democratic primary by Anita Reynolds Howard (D), who had no general challenger

Ballot measures

Amendment 1
"Allow Tax Revenue Dedication"

Authorizes the Georgia State Legislature to pass legislation establishing special funds with dedicated revenue sources to fund statute specific projects.

Amendment 2
"Waive Sovereign Immunity"

Waives the state's sovereign immunity, allowing residents to seek relief through the superior courts from state or local laws that are found to violate the U.S. Constitution, state Constitution, or state law.

Referendum A
"Extend Charity Tax Exemption" 

Exempts property taxes for property owned by a 501(c)(3) public charity as long as the property is owned exclusively for the purpose of building or repairing single-family homes and the charity provides interest-free financing to the purchaser of the home.

See also 

 Voter suppression in the United States 2019–2020: Georgia
 Elections in Georgia (U.S. state)

References

Further reading

External links
 
  (State affiliate of the U.S. League of Women Voters)
Elections  at the Georgia Secretary of State official website

 
 
 
 . (Guidance to help voters get to the polls; addresses transport, childcare, work, information challenges)
 . ("Deadlines, dates, requirements, registration options and information on how to vote in your state")

 
 
Georgia
Georgia
2020-21